Raphaël Patorni (1911–1986) was a French film actor.

Selected filmography
 The Mysteries of Paris (1943)
 The Island of Love (1944)
 Jericho (1946)
 Barry (1949)
 Doctor Laennec (1949)
 The Martyr of Bougival (1949)
 The Secret of Mayerling (1949)
 The Dancer of Marrakesh (1949)
 God Needs Men (1950)
 Old Boys of Saint-Loup (1950)
 Adorable Creatures (1952)
 Alone in the World (1952)
 Imperial Violets (1952)
 Napoleon Road (1953)
 Rasputin (1954)
 The Sheep Has Five Legs (1954)
 The Big Flag (1954) 
 Rasputin (1954)
 Mademoiselle from Paris (1955)
 The Whole Town Accuses (1956)
 Chaque jour a son secret (1958)
 Captain Blood (1960)

References

Bibliography
 Hayward, Susan. French Costume Drama of the 1950s: Fashioning Politics in Film. Intellect Books, 2010.

External links

1911 births
1986 deaths
French male film actors
French male stage actors
Male actors from Paris